Thomas of Perseigne, also known as Thomas of Cîteaux, Thomas Cisterciensis, Thomas the Cistercian, Thomas of Vancelles (died c.1190), was a Cistercian monk of Perseigne Abbey, in what is now Sarthe, France. He is known for one major work, a commentary on the Song of Songs.

His theology is regarded as typical of the mystical approach current in the twelfth century. The commentary contains his theories on aesthetics, and is dedicated to Pons, Bishop of Clermont (in office 1170-1189), formerly Abbot of Clairvaux. It contains a number of citations from classical poets.

References
 THOMAS LE CISTERCIEN, Commentaire sur le Cantique des Cantiques, 1 et 2. Introduction, traduction et notes par Pierre-Yves Émery, Frère de Taizé.  — Abbaye Val Notre-Dame, Saint-Jean-de-Matha, Québec, Abbaye Val Notre-Dame Éditions, 2011, 446 p. et 533 p. (Pain de Cîteaux, Série 3 ; 31-32). 
Denys Turner (1995), Eros and Allegory, Medieval Exegesis of the Song of Songs
David N. Bell, The Commentary on the Song of Songs of Thomas the Cistercian and His Conception of the Image of God, Cîteaux 28 (1977) pp. 5–25
 Pierre-Yves Emery de Taizé, "Thomas le Cistercien: Commentaire sur le Cantique des cantiques", Collectanea cisterciensia 73 (2011) pp. 375–384
 David N. Bell (2013), "Le Commentaire du Cantique des Cantiques de Thomas de Perseigne revisité", Les cisterciens dans le Maine et dans l'Ouest au Moyen Âge, Ghislain Baury, Vincent Corriol, Emmanuel Johans and Laurent Maillet (ed.), Annales de Bretagne et des Pays de l'Ouest, t. 120, n° 3, September 2013, pp. 117–131.

Notes

External links
At History of the Order

Online text of Cantica canticorum cum duobus cômentariis

12th-century French people
French Cistercians
French Christian monks